Stacks are a feature found in Apple's macOS, starting in Mac OS X Leopard.  As the name implies, they "stack" files into a small organized folder on the Dock. At the WWDC07 Keynote Presentation, Steve Jobs stated that in Leopard, the user will be given a default stack called Downloads, in which all downloaded content will be placed.

In the initial release of Leopard, Stacks could be shown two ways, in a "fan" or a "grid". With the release of the 10.5.2 update, a third "list" view was added. This list view allows folder icons to display their contents in pop-out side menus. Originally, if the fan view was too long to fit within the screen, it was automatically displayed as a grid. The user could also choose to have a fan stack always display as a grid, but they could not choose to make it fan out (due to the reason above). After the update, the top item in the fan would allow the user to open the folder in a Finder window.

The list view also shows an Options pop-out menu which, when opened, allows users to change the display method used by the Stack (fan, grid or list), the order items in the Stack are displayed (by name, date created, date modified, date added and kind), and the appearance of the Stack icon in the dock (folder or stack). These options are available in the other three methods by either right-clicking on the icon with the right button of a two-button mouse, or by holding down the Control key on the keyboard while simultaneously clicking with a one-button mouse. Holding down the primary mouse button will target the contextual menu as well.

With the release of Mac OS X Snow Leopard, Stacks have been further enhanced. Stacks will allow viewing a subfolder without moving to a Finder window. Stacks have also been modified to include scroll-bars for folders with many files.

See also

 Hypercard stacks

References

Apple's official page about Mac OS X 10.5 Leopard
CNET's review of Leopard, including information about Stacks

MacOS user interface
Graphical user interface elements